Tony Arnold may refer to:
 Tony Arnold (baseball) (born 1959), American baseball
 Tony Arnold (soprano), American soprano